Rapanea melanophloeos, commonly known as Cape beech, Kaapse boekenhout or isiCalabi, is a dense evergreen tree that is native to the afromontane forests of Southern Africa. Outside forests they are also commonly encountered along stream banks and in gullies.

Distribution

The natural range of this stately tree is from Cape Town in the south, to Zambia in the north. In the Eastern Cape it is sometimes found alongside its smaller coastal relative, Rapanea gilliana. Despite its common name it is not a close relative of the familiar Beech tree of the northern hemisphere, and it is actually more closely related to the Rhododendrons.

Description
Rapanea melanophloeos is a dense evergreen tree. Its leaves, stalks and berries often have a purple or maroon color. This tree is usually dioecious (male and female flowers on different trees) and birds are attracted by its tiny, dark purple berries.
The specific name 'melanophloeos' means 'black bark' and resulted from a mistaken identification of the source tree as Swartbas (Diospyros whyteana).

Cultivation

Rapanea melanophloeos is cultivated as an ornamental tree and screening shrub in gardens, and as a potted bonsai specimen.  It is hardy and grows well in windy areas and near the coast. Once established, the plant is reasonably drought tolerant and has low maintenance needs.

The plant sends up suckers from its roots that eventually become new trees, and so is best not planted adjacent to paving. Rapanea grows easily from seed.

Gallery

References

External links

Rapanea melanophloeos at PlantZAfrica.com

melanophloeos
Flora of Southern Africa
Afromontane flora
Flora of South Africa
Flora of Zambia
Trees of South Africa
Garden plants of Southern Africa
Plants used in bonsai
Ornamental trees
Dioecious plants